Jesse Ylönen (born 3 October 1999) is a Finnish-American professional ice hockey right winger for the  Montreal Canadiens of the National Hockey League (NHL). Ylönen was selected by the Canadiens with the 35th overall pick in the 2018 NHL Entry Draft. He holds dual citizenship of Finland and the United States.

Playing career
Ylönen played as a youth with hometown club, Espoo Blues through to the under-18 level. After a season stint within Jokerit junior program, Ylönen returned to the Blues making his professional debut with Espoo United of the Mestis during the 2016–17 season. Following his first full season with Espoo United in 2017–18, posting an impressive 27 points in 48 games as a rookie.

Opting to remain in Finland to continue his development, Ylönen joined top tier Liiga club, Lahti Pelicans on a two-year contract on 10 April 2018. Ylönen was then selected by the Montreal Canadiens in the second round, 35th overall, of the 2018 NHL Entry Draft.

In his final year under contract with the Pelicans in the 2019–20 season, Ylönen was unable to surpass his rookie season totals, contributing with 12 goals and 22 points through 53 games. On 1 March 2020, with the Pelicans out of playoff contention Ylönen left the Liiga and signed his first contract in North America, agreeing to a contract for the remainder of the season with the Canadiens AHL affiliate, the Laval Rocket.

Personal life
Jesse was born in Scottsdale, Arizona, while his father, Juha, was a member of the Phoenix Coyotes. Juha played seven seasons in the National Hockey League (NHL) and won a bronze medal with the Finnish national team at the 1998 Winter Olympics in Nagano.

Career statistics

Regular season and playoffs

International

References

External links
 

1999 births
Living people
Finnish ice hockey right wingers
Lahti Pelicans players
Laval Rocket players
Montreal Canadiens draft picks
Montreal Canadiens players
Finnish expatriate ice hockey players in Canada